Marissa Steen (born 4 December 1989) is an American professional golfer and LPGA Tour member. She was Symetra Tour Player of the Year in 2014.

Early life, college and amateur career
Steen grew up in West Chester, a suburb of Cincinnati, Ohio and started playing golf at the age of 14. She attended Lakota West High School where she played golf, basketball, softball and played trumpet in the band. A standout performer, she was a member of her high school's 2006 State Championship golf team.

Steen attended the University of Memphis between 2008 and 2012, and earned a bachelor's degree in Sports Management. She competed in every golf event for four years while at Memphis, setting a fair number of records.

Professional career
Steen turned professional and joined the Symetra Tour in 2012. She ended her rookie season ranked 34th, and improved to a rank of 16th in 2013. In 2014 she won the Guardian Retirement Championship at Sara Bay, the Friends of Mission Charity Classic Classic and the Eagle Classic, to earn a "battlefield promotion" to the LPGA Tour. She topped the money list and was awarded Symetra Tour Player of the Year.
 
2015 was her rookie season on the LPGA Tour. Unfortunately, she sustained an injury early in the season. Returning to the Symetra Tour, she earned promotion to the LPGA Tour again after finishing 8th on the 2016 Symetra Tour Money List. In 2017 she finished T10 at the LPGA Final Qualifying Tournament to keep her card for the 2018 LPGA Tour. In 2018 she made two starts on the LPGA Tour before an ankle injury sidelined her for the season.

She finished T8 at the 2019 Women's Australian Open and tied for 10th at the 2021 Women's British Open.

Amateur wins
2010 (3) USA Lady Jaguar Invitational, Montana Bobcat Invitational, UAB Fall Beach Blast
2011 (3) Cincinnati Women's Metropolitan Championship, Lady Eagle Invitational, Memphis Women's Fall Invitational
2012 (1) Chris Banister Golf Classic

Source:

Professional wins (3)

Symetra Tour wins (3)

Results in LPGA majors
Results not in chronological order.

CUT = missed the half-way cut
NT = no tournament
T = tied

References

External links

American female golfers
LPGA Tour golfers
Memphis Tigers women's golfers
Sportspeople from Cincinnati
1989 births
Living people